Abraham Wales (born 14 June 1874) was a Scottish professional footballer who played as an inside left.

Career
Born in Bridgeton, Wales played for Motherwell, Third Lanark, Morton, Fulham and Luton Town.

References

1874 births
Date of death missing
Scottish footballers
Footballers from Glasgow
Association football inside forwards
People from Bridgeton, Glasgow
Scottish Football League players
Motherwell F.C. players
Third Lanark A.C. players
Greenock Morton F.C. players
Fulham F.C. players
Luton Town F.C. players